Edward A. Stevenson Sr. (November 9, 1907 – February 1980) was an American civil servant and politician from New York.

Life
He was born on November 9, 1907, in Kingston, Jamaica. In New York City, he attended high school, City College, New York University, and the Graduate School of Public Administration. He entered the New York City Department of Corrections in 1931 as assistant storekeeper, and rose to become the department's Food Service Director in 1954. He entered politics as a Democrat.

He was a member of the New York State Assembly from 1966 to 1970, sitting in the 176th, 177th and 178th New York State Legislatures. He was the first Caribbean-American to serve in the Assembly.

Ex-Assemblyman Eric Stevenson (born 1966) is his grandson.

References 

1907 births
1980 deaths
Date of death missing
Place of death missing
Emigrants from British Jamaica to the United States
Democratic Party members of the New York State Assembly
Politicians from the Bronx